The Reserve Front was a major formation of the Red Army during the Second World War.

First Formation
The Reserve Front describes either of two distinct organizations during the war. The first version was created on July 30, 1941 in a reorganization of the earlier Front of Reserve Armies. STAVKA Order No.003334, of 14 July, directed that the Front of Reserve Armies include:

24th Army, with ten divisions, three gun, one howitzer, and three corps artillery regiments, and four anti-tank artillery regiments;
28th Army, with nine divisions, one gun, one howitzer, and four corps artillery regiments, and four anti-tank artillery regiments;
29th Army, with five divisions, five regiments of artillery, and two regiments and one squadron of aviation;
30th Army, with five divisions, one corps artillery regiment, and two AA artillery regiments;
31st Army, with six divisions, one corps artillery regiment, and two anti-tank artillery regiments; and
32nd Army, with seven divisions (apparently including the 8th Rifle Division), and one anti-tank artillery regiment.

This Front was encircled and destroyed at Vyazma. 

The surviving forces transferred to the Western Front on October 10, 1941 under the command of Zhukov.

2nd Formation
The second version of this Front was created on April 6, 1943. It incorporated the:
2nd Reserve Army (3rd Formation)
24th Army
53rd Army
66th Army
47th Army
46th Army
5th Guards Tank Army
eight mobile corps

It was reorganized as the Steppe Military District on April 15, 1943 and eventually designated the Steppe Front.

Commanders 
 Lieutenant General of NKVD Ivan A. Bogdanov [Front of Reserve Armies] (14–30 July, 1941)
 General Georgy K. Zhukov (August–September 1941)
 Marshal Semyon M. Budenny (September – 10 October, 1941)
 Lieutenant General Markian M. Popov (6–15 April, 1943)

See also
Reserve of the Supreme High Command
Reserve duty (Israel)

Notes

References
David Glantz, Stumbling Colossus, University Press of Kansas, 1998
David Glantz, Colossus Reborn: The Red Army at War 1941-43, University Press of Kansas, 2005

Western Front